Longtime Companion is a 1989 American romantic drama film directed by Norman René and starring Bruce Davison, Campbell Scott, Patrick Cassidy, and Mary-Louise Parker. The first wide-release theatrical film to deal with the subject of AIDS, the film takes its title from the euphemism The New York Times used during the 1980s to describe the surviving same-sex partner of someone who had died of AIDS.

Plot

Longtime Companion chronicles the first years of the AIDS epidemic as seen through its impact on several gay men and the straight friend of one of them. The film is split into several sections identified by dates.

July 3, 1981
Willy (Campbell Scott), a personal trainer, and his friend John (Dermot Mulroney) are spending time with affluent gay couple David (Bruce Davison) and Sean (Mark Lamos) at their beach house on Fire Island for the 4th of July. Sean is a screenwriter for the popular daytime soap opera  Other People  and David comes from a blue blood background and has a large trust fund. Back in the city, Howard (Patrick Cassidy) is preparing to audition for Sean's soap. His boyfriend is Paul (John Dossett), a business executive and their next-door neighbor is Lisa (Mary-Louise Parker), an antiques dealer, whose brother  Fuzzy (Stephen Caffrey) is a lawyer who represents Howard.

That morning, The New York Times publishes its first article about the rise of a new "gay cancer". The news spreads as friends call each other. Some are immediately concerned, others dismissive. Willy meets Fuzzy at a tea dance later in the afternoon and they begin a relationship. Howard lands the role.

April 30, 1982
John is the first among the group to be diagnosed with the new disease, contracting pneumonia. Howard is given script pages in which his character is slated to become the first openly gay character on daytime television. He is very concerned about typecasting, fearing that by playing gay he will not be offered other sorts of parts. Willy and Fuzzy move in together.

John dies shortly after his admission to the hospital.

June 17, 1983
Willy, Fuzzy, Lisa, David, and Sean gather back on Fire Island with friends Michael and Bob to watch Howard's character come out on the soap opera. The group also discuss a sick neighbor who has become a pariah on the island. That evening, Sean and David argue over Sean's fears that he might be getting sick.

September 7, 1984
Paul is hospitalized with toxoplasmosis. Sean is also hospitalized. Willy visits Sean and is so terrified of becoming infected that he dons a surgical mask and protective gown and, when Sean kisses him on the neck, excuses himself to the bathroom to scrub the spot. Michael (Michael Schoeffling) is also visiting Sean, bringing with him homeopathic preparations and a book by Louise Hay. Howard visits Paul and breaks down sobbing.  Paul tries to reassure and comfort him.

March 22, 1985
Sean has deteriorated to the point of dementia. David is helping with his writing and deceiving the studio into thinking that Sean is still able to work. Fuzzy tries to get Howard a movie role but the producer refuses to cast him because of the rumor that he has AIDS. The same rumor got him fired from his role on Other People. Paul is back in the hospital following a seizure. David takes Sean for a walk but has to take him home when Sean urinates in a fountain at a park. That night Willy catches Fuzzy checking himself for swollen glands and they talk about their fear of dying. "What do you think happens when we die?" Fuzzy asks. "We get to have sex again" is Willy's reply.

January 4, 1986
Sean has deteriorated to the point of near-catatonia and is in constant pain. He has to be strapped into his bed and has lost control of his bowels and bladder and has to wear adult diapers as a result. After sending Sean's nurse on an errand, David sits with Sean and tells him that it is all right to let go. Sean dies. Willy and Lisa come by to help David, and they pick out a suit for Sean to wear to be cremated. Fuzzy calls Gay Men's Health Crisis to find a funeral home.  In a rare moment of levity, Lisa and Willy stumble across a slinky red dress in Sean's closet and consider giving it to the undertaker. Ultimately they decide against it, since "it needs a hat. A big Bea Lillie thing!"

The four go to a Chinese restaurant to write Sean's obituary and include David as his "longtime companion".

May 16, 1987
David has died in his sleep, and this is the day of his memorial service. Bob (Brian Cousins) and Willy eulogize him. At the following reception, the friends recall a time when David tried on his sister's wedding dress, accidentally tripped, and fell down the stairs, still wearing it.

September 10, 1988
Fuzzy and Lisa are volunteering answering phones at GMHC. Willy is a "buddy" to a GMHC client, Alberto (Michael Carmine).

Howard has been diagnosed with AIDS. Although it is not mentioned, the presumption is that Paul has died. Howard uses his remaining fame to raise money for AIDS causes by hosting a benefit which includes a performance by Finger Lakes Trio of the Village People song "YMCA" performed in a pastiche of chamber music style.

July 19, 1989
Willy, Fuzzy and Lisa walk along the beach. They talk about an upcoming ACT UP demonstration. They talk about remembering a time before AIDS and wonder about finding a cure. The film ends with a momentary fantasy sequence, with the friends and others lost to AIDS appearing with them on the beach, before they vanish again and the three are left to walk off the deserted beach while the song "Post-Mortem Bar", by Zane Campbell, plays on the soundtrack.

Cast

Production
The beach house featured in the film is located in Fire Island Pines, New York and was built in 1958.

Critical reception
The film received overwhelmingly positive reviews from critics. Rotten Tomatoes reports a score of 91% based on 22 reviews with an average rating of 7.7/10. The site's consensus reads, "Longtime Companion is a sensitive ensemble AIDS drama, lensed with sympathy which builds to a moving finale".

Roger Ebert wrote “Longtime Companion is about friendship and loyalty about finding the courage to be helpful and the humility to be helped.” Peter Travers from Rolling Stone commented “Funny, Touching and Vital, Longtime Companion is the best American movie so far this year. It is also, astonishingly, the first major feature to detail the gay community’s battle against the AIDS epidemic.”

Awards and nominations

The film was screened in the Un Certain Regard section at the 1990 Cannes Film Festival.

See also
An Early Frost (1985)
Buddies (1985)
Parting Glances (1986)
 Fire Island Pines, New York

References

External links

1989 films
1989 LGBT-related films
American LGBT-related films
Films directed by Norman René
Films set in Long Island
Films set in New York City
Films shot in New York (state)
Films set in the 1980s
Gay-related films
HIV/AIDS in American films
Sundance Film Festival award winners
The Samuel Goldwyn Company films
Films featuring a Best Supporting Actor Golden Globe winning performance
1989 directorial debut films
1989 independent films
1980s English-language films
1980s American films